Andorra competed at the 1994 Winter Olympics in Lillehammer, Norway.

Competitors
The following is the list of number of competitors in the Games.

Alpine skiing

Men

Women

References

Official Olympic Reports
 Olympic Winter Games 1994 results - Andorra

Nations at the 1994 Winter Olympics
1994 Winter Olympics
1994 in Andorran sport